

Events

Pre-1600
1010 – Ferdowsi completes his epic poem Shahnameh.
1126 – Following the death of his mother, queen Urraca of León, Alfonso VII is proclaimed king of León.
1262 – Battle of Hausbergen between bourgeois militias and the army of the bishop of Strasbourg.
1558 – The city of Pori is founded by Duke John on the shores of the Gulf of Bothnia.

1601–1900
1658 – Treaty of Roskilde: After a devastating defeat in the Northern Wars (1655–1661), Frederick III, the King of Denmark–Norway is forced to give up nearly half his territory to Sweden.
1702 – Queen Anne, the younger sister of Mary II, becomes Queen regnant of England, Scotland, and Ireland.
1722 – The Safavid Empire of Iran is defeated by an army from Afghanistan at the Battle of Gulnabad.
1736 – Nader Shah, founder of the Afsharid dynasty, is crowned Shah of Iran.
1775 – An anonymous writer, thought by some to be Thomas Paine, publishes "African Slavery in America", the first article in the American colonies calling for the emancipation of slaves and the abolition of slavery.
1782 – Gnadenhutten massacre: Ninety-six Native Americans in Gnadenhutten, Ohio, who had converted to Christianity, are killed by Pennsylvania militiamen in retaliation for raids carried out by other Indian tribes.
1801 – War of the Second Coalition: At the Battle of Abukir, a British force under Sir Ralph Abercromby lands in Egypt with the aim of ending the French campaign in Egypt and Syria.
1844 – King Oscar I ascends to the thrones of Sweden and Norway.
  1844   – The Althing, the parliament of Iceland, was reopened after 45 years of closure.
1868 – Sakai incident: Japanese samurai kill 11 French sailors in the port of Sakai, Osaka.

1901–present
1910 – French aviator Raymonde de Laroche becomes the first woman to receive a pilot's license.
1916 – World War I: A British force unsuccessfully attempts to relieve the siege of Kut (present-day Iraq) in the Battle of Dujaila.
1917 – International Women's Day protests in Petrograd mark the beginning of the February Revolution (February 23 in the Julian calendar).
  1917   – The United States Senate votes to limit filibusters by adopting the cloture rule.
1921 – Spanish Prime Minister Eduardo Dato Iradier is assassinated while on his way home from the parliament building in Madrid.
1924 – A mine disaster kills 172 coal miners near Castle Gate, Utah.
1936 – Daytona Beach and Road Course holds its first oval stock car race.
1937 – Spanish Civil War: The Battle of Guadalajara begins.
1942 – World War II: The Dutch East Indies surrender Java to the Imperial Japanese Army
  1942   – World War II: Imperial Japanese Army forces captured Rangoon, Burma from British.
1950 – The iconic Volkswagen Type 2 "Bus" begins production.
1963 – The Ba'ath Party comes to power in Syria in a coup d'état
1965 – Vietnam War: US Marines arrive at Da Nang.
1966 – Nelson's Pillar in Dublin, Ireland, destroyed by a bomb.
1979 – Philips demonstrates the compact disc publicly for the first time.
  1979   – Images taken by Voyager I proved the existence of volcanoes on Io, a moon of Jupiter.
1983 – Cold War: While addressing a convention of Evangelicals, U.S. President Ronald Reagan labels the Soviet Union an "evil empire".
1985 – A supposed failed assassination attempt on Islamic cleric Sayyed Mohammad Hussein Fadlallah in Beirut, Lebanon, killing 80 and injuring 200 others.
1988 – Aeroflot Flight 3379 is hijacked by the Ovechkin family and diverted to Veshchevo in the Soviet Union.
2004 – A new constitution is signed by Iraq's Governing Council.
2014 – In one of aviation's greatest mysteries, Malaysia Airlines Flight 370, carrying a total of 239 people, disappears en route from Kuala Lumpur to Beijing. The fate of the flight remains unknown. 
2017 – The Azure Window, a natural arch on the Maltese island of Gozo, collapses in stormy weather.
2021 – International Women's Day marches in Mexico become violent with 62 police officers and 19 civilians injured in Mexico City alone.
  2021   – Twenty-eight political institutions in Myanmar establish the National Unity Consultative Council, a historic alliance of ethnic armed organizations and democratically elected leaders in response to the 2021 Myanmar coup d'état

Births

Pre-1600
1495 – John of God, Portuguese friar and saint (d. 1550)

1601–1900
1712 – John Fothergill, English physician and botanist (d. 1780)
1714 – Carl Philipp Emanuel Bach, German pianist and composer (d. 1788)
1726 – Richard Howe, 1st Earl Howe, English admiral and politician, Treasurer of the Navy (d. 1799)
1746 – André Michaux, French botanist and explorer (d. 1802)
1748 – William V, Prince of Orange (d. 1806)
1761 – Jan Potocki, Polish ethnologist, historian, linguist, and author (d. 1815)
1799 – Simon Cameron, American journalist and politician, United States Secretary of War (d. 1889)
1804 – Alvan Clark, American astronomer and optician (d. 1887)
1822 – Ignacy Łukasiewicz, Polish inventor and businessman, invented the Kerosene lamp (d. 1882)
1827 – Wilhelm Bleek, German linguist and anthropologist (d. 1875)
1830 – João de Deus, Portuguese poet and educator (d. 1896)
1836 – Harriet Samuel, English businesswoman and founder the jewellery retailer H. Samuel (d. 1908)
1841 – Oliver Wendell Holmes Jr., American lawyer and jurist (d. 1935)
1851 – Frank Avery Hutchins, American librarian and educator (d. 1914)
1856 – Bramwell Booth, English 2nd General of The Salvation Army (d. 1929)
  1856   – Colin Campbell Cooper, American painter and academic (d. 1937)
1858 – Ida Hunt Udall, American diarist and homesteader (d. 1915)
1859 – Kenneth Grahame, British author (d. 1932)
1865 – Frederic Goudy, American type designer (d. 1947)
1879 – Otto Hahn, German chemist and academic, Nobel Prize laureate (d. 1968)
1886 – Edward Calvin Kendall, American chemist and academic, Nobel Prize laureate (d. 1972)
1892 – Juana de Ibarbourou, Uruguayan poet and author (d. 1979)
1896 – Charlotte Whitton, Canadian journalist and politician, 46th Mayor of Ottawa (d. 1975)

1901–present
1902 – Louise Beavers, American actress and singer (d. 1962)
  1902   – Jennings Randolph, American journalist and politician (d. 1998)
1907 – Konstantinos Karamanlis, Greek lawyer and politician, President of Greece (d. 1998)
1909 – Beatrice Shilling, English motorcycle racer and engineer (d. 1990)
1910 – Claire Trevor, American actress (d. 2000)
1911 – Alan Hovhaness, Armenian-American pianist and composer (d. 2000)
1912 – Preston Smith, American businessman and politician, Governor of Texas (d. 2003)
  1912   – Meldrim Thomson Jr., American publisher and politician, Governor of New Hampshire (d. 2001)
1914 – Yakov Borisovich Zel'dovich, Belarusian-Russian physicist and astronomer (d. 1987)
1918 – Eileen Herlie, Scottish-American actress (d. 2008)
1921 – Alan Hale Jr., American actor and restaurateur (d. 1990)
1922 – Ralph H. Baer, German-American video game designer, created the Magnavox Odyssey (d. 2014)
  1922   – Cyd Charisse, American actress and dancer (d. 2008)
  1922   – Carl Furillo, American baseball player (d. 1989)
  1922   – Shigeru Mizuki, Japanese author and illustrator (d. 2015)
1924 – Anthony Caro, English sculptor and illustrator (d. 2013)
  1924   – Sean McClory, Irish-American actor and director (d. 2003)
  1924   – Addie L. Wyatt, American civil rights activist and labor leader (d. 2012)
1925 – Warren Bennis, American scholar, author, and academic (d. 2014)
1926 – Francisco Rabal, Spanish actor, director, and screenwriter (d. 2001)
1927 – Ramon Revilla Sr., Filipino actor and politician (d. 2020)
1930 – Bob Grim, American baseball player (d. 1996)
  1930   – Douglas Hurd, English politician
1931 – John McPhee, American author and educator
  1931   – Neil Postman, American author and social critic (d. 2003)
  1931   – Gerald Potterton, English-Canadian animator, director, and producer
1934 – Marv Breeding, American baseball player and scout (d. 2006)
1935 – George Coleman, American saxophonist, composer, and bandleader
1936 – Sue Ane Langdon, American actress and singer
  1936   – Panditrao Agashe, Indian businessman (d. 1986)
1937 – Richard Fariña, American singer-songwriter and author (d. 1966)
  1937   – Juvénal Habyarimana, Rwandan politician, President of Rwanda (d. 1994)
1939 – Jim Bouton, American baseball player and journalist (d. 2019)
  1939   – Lynn Seymour, Canadian ballerina and choreographer
  1939   – Lidiya Skoblikova, Russian speed skater and coach
  1939   – Robert Tear, Welsh tenor and conductor (d. 2011)
1941 – Norman Stone, British historian, author, and academic (d. 2019)
1942 – Dick Allen, American baseball player and tenor (d. 2020)
  1942   – Ann Packer, English sprinter, hurdler, and long jumper
1943 – Susan Clark, Canadian actress and producer
  1943   – Lynn Redgrave, English-American actress and singer (d. 2010)
1944 – Sergey Nikitin, Russian singer-songwriter and guitarist
1945 – Micky Dolenz, American singer-songwriter and actor
  1945   – Anselm Kiefer, German painter and sculptor
1946 – Randy Meisner, American singer-songwriter and bass player
1947 – Carole Bayer Sager, American singer-songwriter and painter
  1947   – Michael S. Hart, American author, founded Project Gutenberg (d. 2011)
1948 – Mel Galley, English rock singer-songwriter and guitarist (d. 2008)
  1948   – Jonathan Sacks, English rabbi, philosopher, and scholar (d. 2020)
1949 – Teofilo Cubillas, Peruvian footballer
1951 – Dianne Walker, American tap dancer
1953 – Jim Rice, American baseball player, coach, and sportscaster
1954 – Steve James, American documentary filmmaker
  1954   – David Wilkie, Sri Lankan-Scottish swimmer
1956 – Laurie Cunningham, English footballer (d. 1989)
  1956   – David Malpass, American economist and government official
1957 – Clive Burr, English rock drummer (d. 2013)
  1957   – William Edward Childs, American pianist and composer
  1957   – Bob Stoddard, American baseball player
1958 – Gary Numan, English singer-songwriter, guitarist, and producer
1959 – Lester Holt, American journalist
  1959   – Aidan Quinn, Irish-American actor
1960 – Irek Mukhamedov, Russian ballet dancer
1961 – Camryn Manheim, American actress
  1961   – Larry Murphy, Canadian ice hockey player
1965 – Kenny Smith, American basketball player and sportscaster
1966 – Greg Barker, Baron Barker of Battle, English politician
1968 – Michael Bartels, German race car driver
1970 – Jason Elam, American football player
1972 – Lena Sundström, Swedish journalist and author
1976 – Juan Encarnación, Dominican baseball player
  1976   – Freddie Prinze Jr., American actor, producer, and screenwriter
  1976   – Hines Ward, Korean-American football player
1977 – James Van Der Beek, American actor
  1977   – Johann Vogel, Swiss footballer
1982 – Leonidas Kampantais, Greek footballer
  1982   – Keemstar, American YouTuber
  1982   – Kat Von D, American tattoo artist and model
1983 – André Santos, Brazilian footballer
  1983   – Mark Worrell, American baseball player
1984 – Ross Taylor, New Zealand cricketer
1985 – Maria Ohisalo, Finnish politician and researcher
1986 – Chad Gable, American wrestler
1990 – Asier Illarramendi, Spanish footballer
  1990   – Petra Kvitová, Czech tennis player
1991 – Tom English, Australian rugby player
1994 – Claire Emslie, Scottish footballer
1996 – Matthew Hammelmann, Australian rules footballer
1997 – Tijana Bošković, Serbian volleyball player
1998 – Tali Darsigny, Canadian weightlifter

Deaths

Pre-1600
1126 – Urraca of León and Castile (b. 1079)
1137 – Adela of Normandy, by marriage countess of Blois (b. c. 1067)
1144 – Pope Celestine II
1403 – Bayezid I, Ottoman sultan (b. 1360)
1466 – Francesco I Sforza, Duke of Milan (b. 1401)
1550 – John of God, Portuguese friar and saint (b. 1495)

1601–1900
1619 – Veit Bach, German baker and miller
1641 – Xu Xiake, Chinese geographer and explorer (b. 1587)
1702 – William III of England (b. 1650)
1717 – Abraham Darby I, English blacksmith (b. 1678)
1723 – Christopher Wren, English architect, designed St. Paul's Cathedral (b. 1632)
1844 – Charles XIV John of Sweden (b. 1763)
1869 – Hector Berlioz, French composer, conductor, and critic (b. 1803)
1872 – Priscilla Susan Bury, British botanist (b. 1799)
  1872   – Cornelius Krieghoff, Dutch-Canadian painter (b. 1815)
1874 – Millard Fillmore, American lawyer and politician, 13th President of the United States (b. 1800)
1887 – Henry Ward Beecher, American minister and activist (b. 1813)
  1887   – James Buchanan Eads, American engineer, designed the Eads Bridge (b. 1820)
1889 – John Ericsson, Swedish-American engineer (b. 1803)

1901–present
1917 – Ferdinand von Zeppelin, German general and businessman (b. 1838)
1923 – Johannes Diderik van der Waals, Dutch physicist and academic, Nobel Prize laureate (b. 1837)
1930 – William Howard Taft, American politician, 27th President of the United States (b. 1857)
  1930   – Edward Terry Sanford, American jurist and politician, United States Assistant Attorney General (b. 1865)
1932 – Minna Craucher, Finnish socialite and spy (b. 1891)
1937 – Howie Morenz, Canadian ice hockey player (b. 1902)
1941 – Sherwood Anderson, American novelist and short story writer (b. 1876)
1942 – José Raúl Capablanca, Cuban chess player (b. 1888)
1944 – Fredy Hirsch, German Jewish athlete who helped thousands of Jewish children in the Holocaust (b. 1916)
1948 – Hulusi Behçet, Turkish dermatologist and scientist (b. 1889)
1957 – Othmar Schoeck, Swiss composer and conductor (b. 1886)
1961 – Thomas Beecham, English conductor and composer (b. 1879)
1971 – Harold Lloyd, American actor, director, and producer (b. 1893)
1973 – Ron "Pigpen" McKernan, American keyboard player and songwriter (b. 1945)
1975 – George Stevens, American director, producer, and screenwriter (b. 1904)
1982 – Hatem Ali Jamadar, Bengali politician (b. 1872)
1983 – Alan Lennox-Boyd, 1st Viscount Boyd of Merton, English lieutenant and politician (b. 1904)
  1983   – William Walton, English composer (b. 1902)
1993 – Billy Eckstine, American trumpet player (b. 1914)
1996 – Jack Churchill, British colonel (b. 1906)
1998 – Ray Nitschke, American football player (b. 1936)
1999 – Adolfo Bioy Casares, Argentinian journalist and author (b. 1914)
  1999   – Peggy Cass, American actress and comedian (b. 1924)
  1999   – Joe DiMaggio, American baseball player and coach (b. 1914)
2003 – Adam Faith, English singer (b. 1940)
  2003   – Karen Morley, American actress (b. 1909)
2004 – Muhammad Zaidan, Syrian terrorist, founded the Palestine Liberation Front
2005 – César Lattes, Brazilian physicist and academic (b. 1924)
  2005   – Aslan Maskhadov, Chechen commander and politician, President of the Chechen Republic of Ichkeria (b. 1951)
2007 – John Inman, English actor (b. 1935)
  2007   – John Vukovich, American baseball player and coach (b. 1947)
2009 – Hank Locklin, American singer-songwriter and guitarist (b. 1918)
2012 – Simin Daneshvar, Iranian author and academic (b. 1921)
2013 – John O'Connell, Irish politician, Irish Minister of Health (b. 1927)
  2013   – Ewald-Heinrich von Kleist-Schmenzin, German soldier and publisher (b. 1922)
2014 – Leo Bretholz, Austrian-American Holocaust survivor and author (b. 1921)
  2014   – William Guarnere, American sergeant (b. 1923)
2015 – Sam Simon, American director, producer, and screenwriter (b. 1955)
2016 – George Martin, English composer, conductor, and producer (b. 1926)
2018 – Kate Wilhelm, American author (b. 1928)
2019 – Marshall Brodien, American actor (b. 1934)
  2019   – Cedrick Hardman, American football player and actor (b. 1948)
2020 – Max von Sydow, Swedish actor (b. 1929)

Holidays and observances
Christian feast day:
Edward King (Church of England)
Felix of Burgundy
John of God
Philemon the actor
March 8 (Eastern Orthodox liturgics)
International Women's Day, and its related observances:
International Women's Collaboration Brew Day

References

External links

 BBC: On This Day
 
 Historical Events on March 8

Days of the year
March